Carlotte Mae Wubben-Moy, known as Lotte Wubben-Moy, (born 11 January 1999) is an English professional footballer who plays as a defender for Arsenal in the FA Women's Super League and the English national team. She previously played college soccer for the North Carolina Tar Heels in the United States and has represented England at multiple youth levels from under-15 up to under-21. Wubben-Moy received her first England Women's Senior camp call up in September 2020. She made her debut for the England Women’s team in March 2021.

Early life
Lotte was born in Bow, London, England to an English mother, Claire Moy and Antonius Wubben, the Dutch owner of Kaizen Furniture Makers; Wubben-Moy is fluent in Dutch. She attended Olga Primary School and for secondary school attended Anglo European School where she was named victrix ludorum in 2015 – also attended Stoke Newington School and Sixth Form for her A-levels. She played football and netball, as well as track and field.

Club career

Arsenal 
Having captained the Arsenal development team to an FA WSL Development Cup and two FA Youth Cup wins, Wubben-Moy made her senior debut aged 16 on 26 July 2015 as a 90th-minute substitute in a 2–1 WSL win over Notts County, one of two appearances she made during the 2015 FA WSL season as Arsenal won both the WSL Cup and FA Cup, completing a cup double.

Despite suffering an injury setback during pre-season ahead of the 2017 FA WSL Spring Series in 2017, Wubben-Moy ended up starting in all eight of Arsenal's Spring Series games as the team finished unbeaten.

North Carolina Tar Heels 
In autumn 2017, Wubben-Moy moved to the United States to play college soccer, joining ACC team North Carolina Tar Heels. She was a three-year starter at centre-back for UNC and was a second-team All-ACC selection in 2019. She scored her first collegiate goal on 8 September 2019 in an 8–0 win against UNLV Rebels, the first of six goals she scored in her junior year.

In August 2020, Wubben-Moy announced she was forgoing her final year of college eligibility amid uncertainty around the season due to the COVID-19 pandemic.

Return to Arsenal
Following three seasons with UNC, Wubben-Moy returned to Arsenal, signing a professional contract on 11 September 2020.

Wubben-Moy scored her first goal for Arsenal on 11 October 2020 against Brighton and Hove Albion after coming on as a substitute in a 5–0 victory.

On 19 March 2021 Wubben-Moy would score her second goal for Arsenal against Manchester United in a game that would finish 2–0; she would go on to win player of the match. At the end of March she was named Barclays WSL Player of the Month.

International career 
Wubben-Moy captained the England under-17 team during the 2016 FIFA U-17 Women's World Cup as the team reached the quarter-finals. Later that year she also captained England at the 2016 UEFA Women's Under-17 Championship, leading them to a third-place finish.

On 23 February 2021, Wubben-Moy made her international debut against Northern Ireland, coming on as a second half substitution for fellow Arsenal player Leah Williamson in a match that would end 6–0 to England. On 27 May 2021, she was named as a reserve player for the Great Britain women's Olympic football team at the 2020 Summer Olympics. In June 2022, Wubben-Moy was included in the England squad which won the UEFA Women's Euro 2022.

Career statistics

College

Club 
.

International
Statistics accurate as of match played 22 February 2023.

Honours
North Carolina Tar Heels
Atlantic Coast Conference regular season: 2018, 2019
ACC Women's Soccer Tournament: 2017, 2019
NCAA Division I College Cup runners-up: 2018, 2019

Arsenal
 FA WSL Cup / FA Women's League Cup: 2015, 2022–23
 FA Cup: 2016

England

UEFA Women's Championship: 2022
Arnold Clark Cup: 2023

Individual
Freedom of the City of London (announced 1 August 2022)

Notes

References

External links
 
 
 England player profile
 North Carolina Tar Heels player profile
 

1999 births
Living people
English women's footballers
Women's Super League players
Arsenal W.F.C. players
English people of Dutch descent
Women's association football defenders
Footballers from Greater London
North Carolina Tar Heels women's soccer players
England women's under-21 international footballers
England women's international footballers
Olympic footballers of Great Britain
Footballers at the 2020 Summer Olympics
UEFA Women's Euro 2022 players
UEFA Women's Championship-winning players